Perpendicular plate can refer to:

 Perpendicular plate of ethmoid bone
 Perpendicular plate of palatine bone